The Vice Admiral James Bond Stockdale Award for Inspirational Leadership is a United States Navy award established in 1980 by United States Secretary of the Navy Edward Hidalgo to honor the inspirational leadership of James Stockdale, a Medal of Honor recipient in the Vietnam War, who exhibited exemplary leadership while a prisoner of war in North Vietnam for nearly eight years. The award was first presented in 1981.

Award criteria
Each year two commanding officers below the grade of captain are selected, one for the United States Atlantic Fleet and one from the United States Pacific Fleet. A board of peer-nominated officers, one from the Atlantic and one for the Pacific, select the winners, based on the five criteria of inspirational leadership that Vice Admiral Stockdale identified in his writing and teaching on leadership.
These criteria are:
Moralist: Have a commitment to a personal code of ethical conduct. 
Jurist: Demonstrate ability to establish policy which can be implemented and obeyed in the most difficult of circumstances.
Teacher: Being an example of self-discipline and sensitivity to others with balanced perspective, creating organizational pride, job satisfaction, and a motivational climate.
Steward: Being an example of personal commitment and an example to others in the maintenance of standards and loyalty.
Philosopher: Show the ability to reason, explain the essence of reality, and recognize the need for forethought in dealing with uncertainty.

Award Winners

Gallery

References

External links 
 

1980 establishments in the United States
Awards and decorations of the United States Navy
Awards established in 1980
Trophies